Jené Morris (born July 21, 1987) is a former female American professional basketball player in the WNBA. She played women's college basketball for San Diego State University.

California and San Diego State statistics

Source

Awards and honors
State Farm Coaches' Honorable Mention All-American (2008–09)
Mountain West Conference Defensive Player of the Year (2008–09)
All-Mountain West Conference First Team (2008–09)
Mountain West Conference All-Defensive Team (2008–09)
Mountain West Conference Championship All-Tournament Team (2008 & 2009)
San Diego Surf 'N Slam Tournament MVP (2008)
Preseason All-Mountain West Conference (2008)
All-Mountain West Conference Second Team (2008)
Honorable Mention Pac-10 All-Freshman Team (2005–06)

References

External links
 Player profile
 Official Twitter

1987 births
Living people
American women's basketball players
Basketball players from San Francisco
California Golden Bears women's basketball players
Guards (basketball)
Indiana Fever draft picks
Indiana Fever players
San Diego State Aztecs women's basketball players
Tulsa Shock players